Doldrums were an American post-rock band formed in Fairfax, Virginia, United States. Formed in 1994, the group consisted of guitarist Justin Chearno, bassist Bill Kellum and drummer Matt Kellum. Most of the band's music is completely improvised, with little or no overdubs. Bill Kellum has cited psychedelic music and krautrock as being particularly influential to him. The band never toured and has not released an album since 2000's Feng Shui.

Discography 
Secret Life of Machines (1995, VHF)
Acupuncture (1997, Kranky)
Desk Trickery (1999, Kranky)
Feng Shui (2000, VHF)

References

External links 
 
 

American post-rock groups
Musical groups established in 1994
Musical groups disestablished in 2000
Musical groups from Virginia
American musical trios
American space rock musical groups
1994 establishments in Virginia
VHF Records artists